William Hunt may refer to:

Australia
 Bill Hunt (cricketer) (1908–1983), Australian Test cricketer of the 1930s
 William Hunt (sprinter) (1898–1977), Australian Olympic sprinter

New Zealand
 Sir William Hunt (businessman) (1867–1939), New Zealand business leader, stock and station agent
 Bill Hunt (alpine skier) (1929–2009), New Zealand Olympic skier

United Kingdom
 William Hunt (banker), Governor of the Bank of England from 1749 to 1752
 William Henry Hunt (painter) (1790–1864), English water-colour painter
 William Holman Hunt (1827–1910), British painter
 William Hunt (priest) (1842–1931), English clergyman and historian
 William Warren Hunt (1909–1994), inaugural Bishop of Repton from 1965 to 1977
 Billy Hunt (footballer) (born 1934), English footballer who played in the 1950s
 William Hunt (officer of arms) (born 1946), English Officer of Arms
 William D. G. Hunt (born 1955), British army NCO and landmine campaigner

United States
 Wilson Price Hunt (1783–1842), or William, pioneer of the Oregon Country in the Pacific Northwest of North America
 William H. Hunt (1823–1884), United States Secretary of the Navy
 William Morris Hunt (1824–1879), American painter
 William Leonard Hunt (1838–1929), American/Canadian acrobat and explorer
 William Henry Hunt (judge) (1857–1949), United States judge
 William Henry Hunt (diplomat) (1863–1951), United States diplomat
 Bill Hunt (racing driver) (1890–1950), American racing driver of the 1920s
 William E. Hunt (1923–2016), Montana Supreme Court associate justice
 William Herbert Hunt (born 1929), American oil billionaire
 W. M. Hunt, American photography collector and dealer
 William Dennis Hunt (1944–2020), American actor
 Will Hunt (born 1971), American drummer

Other
 "Billy Hunt", a song on The Jam's 1978 album All Mod Cons

See also
 Hunt (surname)
 William Henry Hunt (disambiguation)